Cristian Marian Bărbuț (born 22 April 1995) is a Romanian professional footballer who plays as a winger for Liga I club Hermannstadt.

Club career
Bărbuț scored in his Liga I debut on 19 July 2013, playing for ACS Poli Timișoara in the 2-0 win against rivals Dinamo București.

Career statistics

Club

Honours
ACS Poli Timișoara
Liga II: 2014–15
Cupa Ligii runner-up: 2016–17

Universitatea Craiova
Cupa României: 2017–18, 2020–21
Supercupa României runner-up: 2018

Sepsi OSK 
Cupa României: 2021–22
Supercupa României: 2022

References

External links
 
 

Sportspeople from Timișoara
Living people
1995 births
Romanian footballers
Association football midfielders
Romania youth international footballers
Romania under-21 international footballers
Liga I players
Liga II players
ACS Poli Timișoara players
CS Universitatea Craiova players
Sepsi OSK Sfântu Gheorghe players
FC Hermannstadt players